Advanced Placement (AP) Microeconomics (also known as AP Micro) is a course offered by the College Board as part of the Advanced Placement Program for high school students interested in college-level coursework in microeconomics and/or gaining advanced standing in college. The course begins with a study of fundamental economic concepts such as scarcity, opportunity costs, production possibilities, specialization, and comparative advantage. Major topics include the nature and functions of product markets; factor markets; and efficiency, equity, and the role of government. AP Microeconomics is often taken in conjunction with or after AP Macroeconomics.

Topics outline and distribution of topics

Basic Economic Concepts (8-14%)
The Nature and Functions of Product Markets (55-70%)
Factor Markets (10-18%)
Market Failure and the Role of Government (12-18%)

The exam

Multiple Choice [70 minutes, weighted 2/3 (66.7%) of the total exam score]
Free-Response [10 minutes of planning then 50 minutes of writing with one longer free-response question and two shorter ones, weighted 1/3 (33.3%) of the total exam score]

Grade distribution
74,049 students took the AP Microeconomics exam in 2014.

The exam was first held in 1989, along with Macroeconomics.  Grade distributions since 2008 are as follows:

See also
AP Macroeconomics
Microeconomics
Economics
Economics education#Curriculum
Glossary of economics

External links
AP: Microeconomics

Study Resources
 
Free online AP Microeconomics course taught by Prof. Jon Gruber (MIT): https://www.edx.org/course/introductory-ap-microeconomics

Economics education
Advanced Placement